Jeff Zehr (born December 10, 1978) is a Canadian professional ice hockey winger who last played for the Flint Generals of the International Hockey League.  Zehr was drafted 31st overall by the New York Islanders in the 1997 NHL Entry Draft.  He signed with the Boston Bruins as a free agent in 1999, but missed most of 1999–2000 season after suffering a knee injury during practice and only managed to play four games in all for Boston.  He moved to the ECHL afterwards, suiting up for five different teams during a four-year spell. He later purchased the London Lakers, later relocating them to Plattsville, Ontario

Career statistics

Regular season and playoffs

External links

1978 births
Boston Bruins players
Canadian ice hockey forwards
Cincinnati Cyclones (ECHL) players
Columbus Cottonmouths (ECHL) players
Erie Otters players
Flint Generals players
Greensboro Generals players
Greenville Grrrowl players
Ice hockey people from Ontario
Johnstown Chiefs players
Living people
New York Islanders draft picks
People from Woodstock, Ontario
Peoria Rivermen (ECHL) players
Port Huron Icehawks players
Providence Bruins players
Sarnia Sting players
Windsor Spitfires players
Canadian expatriate ice hockey players in the United States